Luan Vinícius da Silva Santos (born 14 May 1999), simply known as Luan, is a Brazilian professional footballer who plays for São Paulo FC as a defensive midfielder.

Club career
Born in São Paulo, Luan joined the youth academy of São Paulo FC in 2010. On 20 July 2018, he was called to the senior team by manager Diego Aguirre as a replacement for the injured Jucilei. Two days later, he made his first team debut, coming on as a substitute for Edimar Fraga in a 3–1 victory over Corinthians.

On 29 July, Luan started for the first time (due to the suspension of Hudson) in a 2–0 win against Cruzeiro. On 23 October, he extended his contract until 2022.

In the 2020/21 season, Luan managed to win ownership with coach Fernando Diniz, and made good matches as defensive midfielder.

On 20 April 2021, Luan scores his first goal in his club career against Sporting Cristal, at the debut of São Paulo by Copa Libertadores 2021.

On 20 May 2021, Luan completed 100 games with the São Paulo FC, playing the final of the Campeonato Paulista against the rival Palmeiras. On 23 May 2021, Luan played the second game of the final and scored the first goal of São Paulo in the game. Later, he would win the trophy.

International career
Luan has been capped by Brazil at under-20 level, captaining the side in a friendly against Chile. On 13 December 2018, he was included in the under-20 squad for the 2019 South American U-20 Championship.

Career statistics

Honours
São Paulo
Campeonato Paulista: 2021

References

External links
Luan at São Paulo FC website

1999 births
Living people
Association football midfielders
Brazilian footballers
Campeonato Brasileiro Série A players
São Paulo FC players
Brazil youth international footballers
Footballers from São Paulo